Anserine (β-alanyl-3-methylhistidine) is a dipeptide containing β-alanine and 3-methylhistidine. Anserine is a derivative of carnosine, which has been methylated. Both anserine and carnosine are capable of chelating copper. Due to its methylation, anserine is more stable in serum and resistant to degradation than carnosine. Anserine can be found in the skeletal muscle and brain of mammals and birds. It can also be found in high levels in the human kidneys. The pKa of the imidazole ring of histidine, when contained in anserine, is 7.04, making it an effective buffer at physiologic pH.

Absorption and clearance 
Due to its presence in lean muscles, like fish and poultry, there have been studies showing that inclusion of anserine in the diet may be beneficial for blood clearance and food absorption. These results were based on L-histidine concentrations at different time intervals. A study observing the effect of anserine diet on blood clearance and food absorption concluded that the data showed an ephemeral anserine level peak in blood after consumption of anserine, followed by a prolonged, high level of methylhistidine. This indicates rapid absorption and clearing of anserine because anserine is catabolized into methylhistidine and alanine by a circulating enzyme.

Clinical significance

Neuroprotective effects 
An animal model study of Alzheimer's disease using mice found that treatment with anserine reduced memory loss. Anserine reduced glial inflammatory activity (particularly of astrocyte). The study also found that anserine-treated mice had greater pericyte surface area. The greater area of pericytes was commensurate with improved memory (pericytes warp around brain capillary to control blood flow and gate cells from neurotoxin, blocking inflammation). The anserine-treated mice overall performed better on a spatial memory test (Morris Water Maze).

A human study on 84 elderly subjects showed that subjects who took anserine and carnosine supplements for one year showed increased blood flow in the prefrontal cortex on MRI.

A study demonstrated that the free N-terminal of histidine on anserine and carnosine protect against zinc-caused neurotoxicity and regulate the Arc pathway in which Arc protein is used to produce dendrite protein for connecting nerve cells.

Both Anserine and Carnosine are chelating agents for copper and other transition metals. Chelation of transition metals is one method used by antioxidants to protect their targets from oxidative stress as it prevents them from undergoing Fenton reactions with peroxides. In the olfactory bulbs, the concentration of both of these molecules was found to be in the millimolar range, whereas the concentration of copper was approximately 50μM. these found concentrations indicate the chelation of copper by Anserine and Carnosine.

See also 

 Carnosine

References 

Dipeptides